Preußisches Märchen (Prussian Legend) is a 1952 opera buffa with simultaneous ballet by Boris Blacher to a libretto by Heinz von Cramer based on the real life con-man Captain of Köpenick and Zuckmayer's play of the same title. The opera was the composer's first comic opera, premiered in West Berlin 23 September 1952.

Recordings
Lisa Otto (Vater Fadenkreutz), Ivan Sardi (Mutter Fadenkreutz), Manfred Röhrl (Wilhelm), Gerti Zeumer (Auguste), Donald Grobe (Assessor Birkhahn), Victor von Halem (Bürgermeister), 1974 Deutsche Oper Berlin Caspar Richter (conductor) & Winfried Bauernfeind (stage director) DVD

References

Operas
1949 operas
Operas by Boris Blacher